Johann Gottfried Teske ( – ) was a Prussian physicist and philosopher who is best known for his collaboration with Immanuel Kant on his work De Igne.

Life
Teske studied from 1719 at the University of Königsberg. He later moved to the University of Halle, where on 27 May 1726 he acquired a master's degree. He returned to the University of Königsberg on 10 August 1726 where he became a lecturer of philosophy. In 1728 he became an associate professor of logic and metaphysics and in 1729 a full professor of physics. In 1733 he was appointed to the Samland Konsistorialrat. He also became Vice President and Official at the Consistory.

In 1760 he received an honorary professorship at the University of St. Petersburg as an honorary member of the Russian Academy of Sciences. Teske's most famous pupil was Immanuel Kant, whom he accompanied as a mentor in acquiring a master's degree and assisted in his script on the fire (de igne). Teske, who was the first physicist at the University of Königsberg, was involved in the study of electricity. He also participated in the organizational tasks of Königsberg University. He was dean of the faculty of philosophy and in the summer of 1772 became the rector of the alma mater.

Works
 Diss. de longitudine fixarum mutabili, latitudine immutabili. Königsberg
 Diss. de intellectu divino. Königsberg
 Diss. de igne ex chalybis silicisque collisione nascente. Königsberg
 Diss. de origine fontium. Königsberg
 Diss. de incomprehensibilitate Dei. Königsberg 1743
 Abhandlung von Electricität. neben zwei andern Abhandlungen gleichen Inhalts von der königl. Akademie der Wissenschaften in Berlin zum Druck befördert. 1745
 Neue Entdeckung verschiedener bisher noch unbekannter Wirkungen und Eigenschaften der Electricität. Königsberg 1746
 Diss. de phialis vitreis ab illabente minimo silice dissilientibus. Königsberg 1751
 Neue Versuche in Curirung der Zahnschmerzen, vermittelst des magnetischen Stahls. Königsberg 1765
 Anmerkung und Betrachtung über die ungewöhnliche Kälte im J. 1740. in den Königsberger Intelligenzblätter

Literature
 Johann Georg Meusel: Lexikon der vom Jahr 1750 bis 1800 verstorbenen teutschen Schriftsteller. Gerhard Fleischer d. J., Leipzig, 1815, Bd. 14, S. 28 ff. (Online.)
 
 Johann Christian Poggendorff: Biographisch-literarisches Handwörterbuch zur Geschichte der exacten Wissenschaften. Johann Ambrosius Barth, Leipzig, 1863, 2. Bd., S. 1083. (Online.)

References

External links 
 Index Königsberger Professoren  (German)
 Bibliographie  Johann Gottfried Teske (German)

1704 births
1772 deaths
18th-century German philosophers
18th-century German physicists
Scientists from Königsberg